E. densifolia may refer to:

 Encelia densifolia, a desert plant
 Epipactis densifolia, a terrestrial orchid
 Euphorbia densifolia, a flowering plant
 Eutaxia densifolia, a shrub endemic to Western Australia